The Roman Catholic Diocese of Hanyang is a Latin suffragan diocese in the Ecclesiastical province of Hankou in PR China, yet still depends on the Roman missionary Congregation for the Evangelization of Peoples.

Its cathedral episcopal see is the Cathedral of St. Columban in Hanyang (Wuhan), Hubei.

History 
 December 12, 1923: Established as Apostolic Prefecture of Hanyang 漢陽, on territory split off from the then Apostolic Vicariate of Eastern Hupeh 湖北東境
 July 14, 1927: Promoted as Apostolic Vicariate of Hanyang 漢陽
 April 11, 1946: Promoted as Diocese of Hanyang 漢陽, losing its exempt missionary status

Ordinaries 
(all Roman Rite)
 Apostolic Prefects of Hanyang 漢陽 
 Fr. Edward J. Galvin, S.S.C.M.E. (later Bishop) (November 1, 1924 – July 14, 1927)

Apostolic Vicar of Hanyang 漢陽 
 Edward J. Galvin, S.S.C.M.E. (see above July 14, 1927 – April 11, 1946 see below), Titular Bishop of Myrina (1927.07.14 – 1946.04.11)

Suffragan Bishops of Hanyang 漢陽 
 Edward J. Galvin, S.S.C.M.E. (see above April 11, 1946 – February 23, 1956)
uncanonical: Anthony Tu Shi-hua (涂世華)  (1959 – ..., without papal mandate)
 Peter Zhang Bairen (1984 clandestine consecration - October 12, 2005)
Apostolic Administrator Chen Tian-huai (陳天懷) (2005 – ...)

References

Sources and external links

 GCatholic.org 
 Catholic Hierarchy 

Roman Catholic dioceses in China
Christian organizations established in 1923
Roman Catholic dioceses and prelatures established in the 20th century
Religion in Hubei